Charakonda is a mandal (district sub-division) in the Nagarkurnool District in the Indian state of Telangana. The district and its subdivisions were created by the Telangana government in 2016 as part of a reorganization of the state's districts, mandals and revenue divisions; prior to that the region encompassed by the newly formed Charakonda mandal were included in the Mahbubnagar district

Villages 
  CHARAKONDA 
 Borabanda thanda
 Thimmaipally
 Kamalpur
 Jupally
 Gokaram
 Seriappareddipally
 Thurkalapally

 Marripally

Geography 

Charakonda is located at 16°44′N 77°30′E (16.73° N, 77.5° E). It has an average elevation of 431 metres (1,414 feet).

Notable people
 Indira Shoban activist.

References

https://www.youtube.com/channel/UCH8SpMWJXq0ctjWtFtv3A9Q

Villages in Nagarkurnool district
Mandals in Nagarkurnool district